The Jarawa or Jrāwa were a nomadic Berber Zenata tribal confederacy, who probably converted to Christianity. The Berber tribe ruled in northwest Africa before and during the 7th century. Under queen Dihya, the tribe led the Berber resistance against the Umayyad Islamic invasion in the late 7th century.

References

Muslim conquest of the Maghreb
Zenata

Berber peoples and tribes
Berber history